The year 1974 was marked by many events that left an imprint on the history of Soviet and Russian Fine Arts.

Events
 Exhibition of works of Leningrad artists devoted to 30th Anniversary of Victory under Leningrad was opened in the Leningrad Union of Artists.
 Art Exhibition named «Arkhip Kuindzhi and his pupils» was opened in the Museum of the Academy of Arts in Leningrad.
 Exhibition of works by Isaak Brodsky devoted to 90-years Anniversary was opened in the Museum of the Academy of Arts in Leningrad.
 Exhibition of works by Alexander Samokhvalov, devoted to 80-years Anniversary was opened in Leningrad in the Russian museum.
 The Spring Exhibition of works by Leningrad artists of 1974 was opened in the Leningrad Union of Artists. The participants were Veniamin Borisov, Nikolai Galakhov, Ivan Godlevsky, Irina Dobrekova, Mikhail Kozell, Engels Kozlov, Maya Kopitseva, Elena Kostenko, Gevork Kotiantz, Yaroslav Krestovsky, Vladimir Krantz, Boris Lavrenko, Ivan Lavsky, Oleg Lomakin, Vera Nazina, Mikhail Natarevich, Sergei Osipov, Nikolai Pozdneev, Vladimir Sakson, Alexander Semionov, Elena Skuin, German Tatarinov, Nikolai Timkov, Vitaly Tulenev, Alexander Shmidt, Lazar Yazgur, and other important Leningrad artists.

Deaths
 April 12 — Yevgeny Vuchetich, Russian soviet sculptor, People's Artist of the USSR, Stalin Prize winner, Lenin Prize winner (born 1908).
 April 25 — Adrian Kaplun, Russian soviet painter and graphic artist, Honored Artist of the RSFSR (born 1887).
 July 12 — Yury Annenkov, Russian painter and graphic artist, since 1924 lived in France (born 1889).
 October 28 — Eduard Krimer, Russian painter, graphic artist, and theatre artist (born 1900).
 November 12 — Victor Popkov, Russian soviet painter (born 1932).
 November 25 — Lev Muravin, Russian soviet sculptor (born 1906).
 December 27 — Nina Ivanova, Russian soviet painter (born 1919).

See also

 List of Russian artists
 List of painters of Leningrad Union of Artists
 Saint Petersburg Union of Artists
 Russian culture

References

Sources
 Весенняя выставка произведений ленинградских художников 1974 года. Каталог. Л., Художник РСФСР, 1976.
 Андрей Яковлев. Выставка произведений. Каталог. Л., Художник РСФСР, 1974.
 Александр Николаевич Самохвалов. Каталог выставки. Л., ГРМ, 1974.
 Юрий Станиславович Подляский. Выставка произведений. Каталог. Л., Художник РСФСР, 1974.
 Орешников Виктор Михайлович. Каталог выставки произведений.. Л., Искусство, 1974.
 Бродский Исаак Израилевич. Каталог выставки произведений. К 90-летию со дня рождения. Л., Искусство, 1974.
 Виктор Иосифович Рейхет. Каталог выставки.. Л., Искусство, 1974.
 Directory of Members of Union of Artists of USSR. Volume 1,2. Moscow, Soviet Artist Edition, 1979.
 Directory of Members of the Leningrad branch of the Union of Artists of Russian Federation. Leningrad, Khudozhnik RSFSR, 1980.
 Artists of Peoples of the USSR. Biography Dictionary. Vol. 4 Book 1. Moscow, Iskusstvo, 1983.
 Directory of Members of the Leningrad branch of the Union of Artists of Russian Federation. - Leningrad: Khudozhnik RSFSR, 1987.
 Artists of peoples of the USSR. Biography Dictionary. Vol. 4 Book 2. - Saint Petersburg: Academic project humanitarian agency, 1995.
 Link of Times: 1932 - 1997. Artists - Members of Saint Petersburg Union of Artists of Russia. Exhibition catalogue. - Saint Petersburg: Manezh Central Exhibition Hall, 1997.
 Matthew C. Bown. Dictionary of 20th Century Russian and Soviet Painters 1900-1980s. - London: Izomar, 1998.
 Vern G. Swanson. Soviet Impressionism. - Woodbridge, England: Antique Collectors' Club, 2001.
 Время перемен. Искусство 1960—1985 в Советском Союзе. СПб., Государственный Русский музей, 2006.
 Sergei V. Ivanov. Unknown Socialist Realism. The Leningrad School. - Saint-Petersburg: NP-Print Edition, 2007. - , .
 Anniversary Directory graduates of Saint Petersburg State Academic Institute of Painting, Sculpture, and Architecture named after Ilya Repin, Russian Academy of Arts. 1915 - 2005. - Saint Petersburg: Pervotsvet Publishing House, 2007.

Art
Soviet Union